A telomere (pl.; telomeres or telomeron), literally "end piece", is a term in insect morphology, and refers to a type of "genital clasper"; i.e.:  in Mallophaga, a part of the genital sac that forms a sclerotized plate on both sides of the penis. The telomere may have sensilla.

Present in higher insect orders from Orthoptera to Hymenoptera. In adult insects of these orders, genital claspers may develop in two segments, a proximal basimere and a distal telomere.

Insect morphology